Cardiff West  may refer to:

 Cardiff West (Senedd constituency)
 Cardiff West (UK Parliament constituency)